Gnaphalium is a genus of flowering plants in the family Asteraceae, commonly called cudweeds. They are widespread and common in temperate regions, although some are found on tropical mountains or in the subtropical regions of the world.

Cudweeds are important foodplants for American painted lady caterpillars. Additionally, they are widely used as an herbal treatment for rheumatic pain.

Species
Species in this genus include:

Formerly included

Numerous species have at one time been included in Gnaphalium, but are now considered to belong to other genera:  Achyrocline, Aliella, Ammobium, Anaphalioides, Anaphalis, Anaxeton, Antennaria, Argyrotegium, Belloa, Berroa, Blumea, Castroviejoa, Chevreulia, Chionolaena, Chrysocephalum, Dolichothrix, Edmondia, Euchiton, Ewartia, Facelis, Filago, Galeomma, Gamochaeta, Gnomophalium, Helichrysum, Ifloga, Laphangium, Lasiopogon, Leontonyx, Leontopodium, Leucogenes, Logfia, Lucilia, Luciliocline, Metalasia, Micropsis, Neojeffreya, Novenia, Ozothamnus, Pentzia, Petalacte, Phagnalon, Pilosella, Plecostachys, Pseudognaphalium, Pterocaulon, Rhodanthe, Raoulia, Schizogyne, Staehelina, Stuckertiella, Syncarpha, Troglophyton, Vellereophyton, Xerochrysum

Secondary metabolites 
Gnaphalium species are known to contain flavonoids and diterpenes. Recently, two unique caffeoyl-D-glucaric acid derivatives, leontopodic acid and leontopodic acid B formerly only known from Leontopodium alpinum (L.) Cass. were detected in various species of Gnaphalium together with similar formerly unknown compounds.

References

External links
 
 
 Jepson Manual Treatment
 United States Department of Agriculture PLANTS Profile for Gnaphalium

 
Asteraceae genera